Antwerpen (M944) is the ninth ship in the City / Vlissingen-class mine countermeasures vessels, and fifth to be built for the Belgian Navy.

References

Mine warfare vessel classes
Minehunters of Belgium